Icky Boyfriends were a locally noted indie band based in San Francisco from 1989 to 1995.
They were the subject of the movie I'm Not Fascinating by filmmaker Danny Plotnick.

Local hit song "Burrito in the Jockstrap", opens their 2 CD retrospective album "A Love Obscene" on Menlo Park Records, released in 2005.

The band reunited in 2010.

References

Indie rock musical groups from California
Musical groups from San Francisco